Joachim Reil (born 17 May 1955) is a retired German ice hockey player. He competed in the men's tournaments at the 1980 Winter Olympics, the 1984 Winter Olympics and the 1988 Winter Olympics.

Career statistics

References

1955 births
Living people
German ice hockey players
Olympic ice hockey players of West Germany
Ice hockey players at the 1980 Winter Olympics
Ice hockey players at the 1984 Winter Olympics
Ice hockey players at the 1988 Winter Olympics
Sportspeople from Garmisch-Partenkirchen
Adler Mannheim players
ECD Iserlohn players
Starbulls Rosenheim players
SC Riessersee players